Fernando Fontes Couto (born 4 December 1959) is a Portuguese long-distance runner. He competed in the men's 5000 metres at the 1988 Summer Olympics and in the men's 10000 metres at the 1992 Summer Olympics.

References

1959 births
Living people
Athletes (track and field) at the 1988 Summer Olympics
Athletes (track and field) at the 1992 Summer Olympics
Portuguese male long-distance runners
Olympic athletes of Portugal
Place of birth missing (living people)